TsUM — Central Universal Department Store is a department store in Almaty. The store is located at the intersection of Abylai Khan Prospekt and Arbat pedestrian zone.

History

Soviet era
The store was built in 1961 according to the design of the Kazgiproselstroy Institute. The facade of the building was designed in the tradition of Stalinist architecture and decorated with bas-reliefs, and marble stairs with carved parapets were equipped inside. The total floor space of the building was 4,500 m2. The volume of trade in the first year of operation reached 42.8 million rubles. Soon there was a need for additional space.

In 1969, an additional building was built next to the first building, made in a style close to the traditions of constructivism. The four-story building was finished with continuous glazing tapes, and the walls of the rooms inside were marble.

The total area of the two department store buildings was 10,128 m2, and the area of the utility rooms was 5,830 m2. The store had 5 consumer complexes located on three floors: “Household goods”, “Household culture” (1st floor), “Products for men” (2nd floor), “Products for women”, “Products for sewing and needlework ”(3rd floor). The store provided 46 types of additional services: fine fitting of garments, cutting fabrics, processing goods on credit. The transagency took orders for the delivery of bulky goods to the house, a watchmaker, an engraver worked. In addition to the trading sections, the services of customers included: a dining room, a cafeteria, an atelier for clothing fitting and a hairdresser. The department store was equipped with modern commercial and technical equipment. Since 1980, trade and technological processes have been changed, most of the sections of the Central Department Store began to work on the principle of self-service. A linear arrangement of equipment of new samples were also applied, the goods were divided by consumer complexes. TSUM also had several branches, which included the Kyzyl-Tan fabric store.

About 130 thousand customers visited the TSUM daily, making over 80 thousand purchases. The annual turnover amounted to 150 million rubles (as of 1982).

The number of department store employees in the 1980s reached 1,600 people when TsUM sports teams and amateur art groups functioned. As part of public work, the Central Department Store maintained bilateral patronage relations not only with the collective farms of the Alma-Ata region, but also with the crew of the atomic cruiser Kirov, which was part of the Northern Fleet of the Soviet Navy. In 1980, department store employees took part in serving guests of the Moscow Olympics.

In 1987, in the basement of the department store, the filming of a scene from The Needle took place.

Modern period
In 1994, as part of the economic reforms, Western consultants recommended privatizing the store by selling it to private entities. The store was transformed into the joint-stock company Kazakh Republican Trading House ZANGAR. The Butya holding company, well known in Kazakhstan, became the owner of the company. Since then, numerous sellers and tenants have begun to work in the TSUM trading floors. In 1998, to the second building from the Alimjanov street, was attached to the five-story administrative building. In the mid-2000s, on the first floor of the second department store building, there was a mobile flea market selling cell phones and their accessories.

In 2013, Ardis LLP developed the initial global building reconstruction project, which was subsequently revised. The reconstruction lasted from 1 April 2013 to September 2014. During its course, the external and internal appearance of the second building was radically changed, the previously glazed facade from the 2nd to 4th floor was replaced by deaf colored plastic panels, on which places for placing advertising banners were arranged. The basement was partially rebuilt for retail space, which housed a branch of the Magnum ATAK retail and a chain. The facade of the first department store building and its internal marble staircases were partially preserved in their original form. Additional windows and entrances were arranged in the building, the rooms were divided into several separate ones, to which a separate entrance leads from the outside. At the site of the courtyard, between the two buildings, a six-story cinema building was erected.

References 

Department stores of Kazakhstan
Shopping malls in Almaty
Buildings and structures in Almaty
Department stores of the Soviet Union